Sébastien Gérardin (9 March 1751 in Mirecourt – 17 July 1816 in Paris) was a French naturalist.

After training for the priesthood, Sébastien Gérardin became canon of Poussay in 1790. He was passionately interested in natural history, which he taught  at l’École centrale d'Épinal. There he assembled a cabinet of curiosities as well as the botanical garden. He was employed by the Muséum national d'histoire naturelle in Paris from 1803.

Works 
1784 : Lettre d'un Anglois à un François sur la découverte du magnétisme animal, et observations sur cette lettre, A. Bouillon ed.
1805 : Tableau élémentaire de botanique (Perlet, Paris).
1806 : Tableau élémentaire d'ornithologie, ou Histoire naturelle des oiseaux que l'on rencontre communément en France (Tourneisen fils, Paris) — 2nd ed.: 1822.
1810 :  (F. Schoell, Paris, 2 volumes).
1817 : Dictionnaire raisonné de botanique publié, revu et augmenté... par Mr N.-A. Desvaux (Dondey-Dupré, Paris).

References
Jaussaud, Philippe and Brygoo, Édouard R. (2004). Du Jardin au Muséum en 516 biographies. Muséum national d’histoire naturelle de Paris : 630 p.

French naturalists
French ornithologists
19th-century French botanists
People from Mirecourt
1751 births
1816 deaths
18th-century French botanists